David Stewart Porter (September 23, 1909 – January 5, 1989) was a United States district judge of the United States District Court for the Southern District of Ohio.

Education and career

Born in Cincinnati, Ohio, Porter received an Artium Baccalaureus degree from the University of Cincinnati in 1932 and a Juris Doctor from the University of Cincinnati College of Law in 1934. He was an attorney for the Legal Department of the Tennessee Valley Authority from 1935 to 1936. He was in private practice in Troy, Ohio from 1936 to 1949. He was a judge of the Court of Common Pleas for Miami County, Ohio from 1949 to 1966.

Federal judicial service

Porter was nominated by President Lyndon B. Johnson on September 30, 1966, to the United States District Court for the Southern District of Ohio, to a new seat created by 80 Stat. 75. He was confirmed by the United States Senate on October 20, 1966, and received his commission on November 3, 1966. He served as Chief Judge from 1977 to 1979. He assumed senior status on September 23, 1979. Porter served in that capacity until his death on January 5, 1989.

References

Sources
 

1909 births
1989 deaths
Ohio state court judges
Judges of the United States District Court for the Southern District of Ohio
United States district court judges appointed by Lyndon B. Johnson
20th-century American judges
University of Cincinnati College of Law alumni
Lawyers from Cincinnati
20th-century American lawyers
Ohio lawyers